Kotchandpur Govt. Model Pilot Secondary School (Bengali: কোটচাঁদপুর সরকারি মডেল পাইলট মাধ্যমিক বিদ্যালয়) is a secondary school located in Kotchandpur Upazila. It is one of the oldest secondary schools of Bangladesh and the most renowned school of Kotchandpur Upazila. It's EIIN: 116644.

History

The school was first established as a primary school and later turned into a secondary school in 1889. Later in 1899, the school was named Kotchandpur English High School at the initiative of Edward George MacLeod, Mr. B. Allen, Mr. JJ Platel and Mr. Masudul Haq. After shifting it to the house of Clive MacLeod, the school was named Kotchandpur High School. Later, it was again renamed Kotchandpur Pilot High School. After nationalization in 2018, the school took the shape of Kotchandpur Govt. Model Pilot Secondary School.

Campus

The school has a 11.78 acre campus with a large playground and a lot of trees. It is situated beside the Kapotaksha River. It has 3 two-storied buildings, 6 one-storied buildings, 1 auditorium, 1 mosque and 36 rooms for educational purposes.

School uniform

Wearing the school uniform is compulsory for all the students. The uniform for boys includes a white shirt with three navy blue stripes on shoulder and a navy blue trouser. The boys have to wear white shoes.

Curriculum

Kotchandpur Govt. Model Pilot Secondary School provides education to its students in the Secondary level in Bengali medium under the national curriculum. The school is affiliated with Jashore Education Board. This is a combined school, both boys and girls can admit here. There is an admission process for admitting into the school. Students have to seat for admission test to be admitted. The school offers its education in Bengali language. As of 2018, the school has approximately 1500 students and 30 teachers.

Extracurricular activities

The school puts deep emphasise on the extracurricular activities that would ensure the betterment of mental as well as physical health of its students.

Every year, students take part in the annual sports and cultural competition.

The school possesses passionate cricket and football teams which actively participate in the inter-school championships.

Notable alumni

 Md. Shamsuddin - Deputy Director and General, Post and Telegraph Pakistan.
 Babu Shailandra Nath Mukhapaddhay - Deputy Postmaster General, Post and Telegraph Kolkata.
 Dr. Atiar Rahman - Doctor of Medicine, Queen Elizabeth Hospital, England.
 Dr. Ashraf Ali - Doctor of Science, Manager, Boeing, USA.
 Dr. Rakib Uddin - Professor and Head of Chemistry, Rajshahi University.

References

External links
 Official Website

Schools in Jhenaidah District
High schools in Bangladesh